The 2011 FIBA Africa Under-16 Championship for Women (alternatively the Afrobasket U16) was the 2nd U-16 FIBA Africa championship, played under the auspices of the Fédération Internationale de Basketball, the basketball sport governing body and qualified for the 2012 World Cup. The tournament was held from July 22–30 in Alexandria, Egypt, contested by 6 national teams and won by Mali.

Squads

Teams

Format
The 6 teams played a round robin system for the preliminary round.
From there on a knockout system was used until the final.

Preliminary round
Times given below are in UTC+2.

Knockout stage

Semifinals

Bronze medal game

Gold medal game

Final standings

Awards

All-Tournament Team

 G  Farida Wael
 G  Wafa Lobiri
 F  Rosa Gala
 F  Maïmouna Diallo
 C  Khouloud Akroute

See also
 2011 FIBA Africa Championship for Women

External links
Official Website

References

2011 FIBA Africa Under-16 Championship for Women
2011 FIBA Africa Under-16 Championship for Women
2011 FIBA Africa Under-16 Championship for Women
International basketball competitions hosted by Egypt
2011 in youth sport